Ranjit Singh Balian was an Indian politician, and a member of Shiromani Akali Dal. He served as Cabinet Minister in Punjab, and MLA twice from Sangrur. Balian died on 16 February 2016 in Mohali, at age of 61.

References 

Indian politicians
1955 births
2016 deaths